Lorelle Denise Semley (born 1969) is an American historian of Africa specialized in modern West Africa, French imperialism, gender, and the Atlantic World. She is a professor of history at the College of the Holy Cross.

Life 
Semley completed a B.S. in French at the Georgetown University School of Languages and Linguistics in 1991. Her undergraduate advisors included Gwendolyn Mikell and David Johnson. She earned a M.A. in African Studies at Yale University in 1995. Semley's interest in history and African studies was furthered graduate courses she took by Robert Harms, Angelique Haugerud, Christopher Miller, and Diana Wylie. Semley completed a M.A. (1996) and Ph.D. (2002) in History at Northwestern University. Her dissertation was titled Kétu Identities: Islam, Gender, and French Colonialism in West Africa, 1850s-1960s. Semley's doctoral advisor was John Hunwick.

Semley was an assistant professor in the history department at Wesleyan University from 2003 to 2011. She was chair of the African studies cluster from 2008 to 2010. She joined the faculty at the College of the Holy Cross in 2011 where she is a professor in the history department. Semley teaches courses in Africana studies, peace and conflict studies, and gender, sexuality, and women's studies. She specializes in modern West Africa, French imperialism, gender, and the Atlantic World.

Selected works

References

External links
 

Living people
1969 births
Place of birth missing (living people)
Historians of Africa
American Africanists
American women historians
African-American historians
African-American women academics
American women academics
African-American academics
Wesleyan University faculty
College of the Holy Cross faculty
Georgetown College (Georgetown University) alumni
Yale University alumni
Northwestern University alumni
21st-century American women writers
21st-century American historians
21st-century African-American women writers
21st-century African-American writers
20th-century African-American people
20th-century African-American women